Samuel Vaisberg House is a historic home located at Long Beach in Nassau County, New York. It was built in 1927 in the boom years before the Great Depression.  It is a rectangular, -story, Spanish Revival-style residence with a stucco exterior and a clay tile, hipped roof.  It features decorative art glass windows.  Also on the property is a stucco garage.

It was listed on the National Register of Historic Places in 2005.

References

Houses on the National Register of Historic Places in New York (state)
Spanish Revival architecture in the United States
Houses completed in 1927
Houses in Nassau County, New York
Long Beach, New York
National Register of Historic Places in Hempstead (town), New York